Orenaia arcticalis is a moth in the family Crambidae. It was described by Eugene G. Munroe in 1974. It is found in Canada, where it has been recorded from the Northwest Territory and Yukon Territory.

References

Evergestinae
Moths described in 1974